David Müller (born 1 November 1991) is a German footballer. He plays as a midfielder.

On 20 April 2011 Müller had his debut for VfB Stuttgart II in the 3. Liga against Kickers Offenbach. Four days later he scored his first goal in the 3. Liga against Rot Weiss Ahlen.

On 1 January 2012 Müller moved to FC Schalke 04 II.

References

External links
 
 

1991 births
Living people
People from Esslingen am Neckar
Sportspeople from Stuttgart (region)
German footballers
Association football midfielders
3. Liga players
Regionalliga players
Oberliga (football) players
Stuttgarter Kickers players
VfB Stuttgart II players
FC Schalke 04 II players
SGV Freiberg players
Footballers from Baden-Württemberg